Uma Bardhan  (born in 1945) is an Indian contemporary artist. Her paintings are usually themed on stories and positions which are under-represented in both mainstream and contemporary art culture. Her preferred medium is water color on silk, and she has also worked in other media, including oil on canvas. Her paintings are in several major collections in India & abroad. Her works has been hugely inspired by her formative years in Kolkata and her deep belief in spirituality. Originally from Kolkata she lives & works in Gurgaon, Haryana

Early life and education 
Uma Bardhan started her work in early 20s, completed her Bachelor of Arts, from University of Calcutta followed by Diploma in fine arts from Birla Academy of Art and Culture, West Bengal under the tutelage of eminent artists like Makhan Dutta Gupta in oil color and Maniklal Banerjee in water colour.

She was always inclined towards art from her childhood. She used to like poems of Rabindranath Tagore very much & used to draw sketches by reading & visualising his poems in her mind.

Art career 
The concern and contemplation on multiple aspects related to Mother Nature get expressed by works of Artist Uma Bardhan. She weaves her protagonists, Hindu God and Goddess, women, birds and other natural elements into visual thoughts, into strokes of spirituality as one breathe in the colors, flow with the textures and soak in the spirit of mother nature. Being spiritual at heart Hindu God & Goddess always remains as part of her theme.

Uma Bardhan did her first solo art show in 1987, followed by numerous solo shows across decade. Her solo show Cosmic dance of Shiva I 2014 was themed on various form of dancing Shiva who is beneath all the creations and destruction's in this world.

Her interest in the subject & spirituality took her to countless Shiva temples across India.

In another exhibition at the Academy of Fine Arts, Bardhan portrays the predominance of artificial environment prevalent in present-day  city life as a contrast to the pristine beauty of nature in rural life. This series is hugely inspired by her formative years in Kolkata and the time she spent travelling to the interior villages and tribal areas of Bengal—a motif which keeps recurring in her works.

Water Color on Silk 

She is one of a very few artist who uses a medium "Water Colour on Silk". A painstaking process 
where a special silk cloth is mounted on board before it can be used for painting. The reason it's not so popular might be due to the fact that it is a relatively painstaking process where a special silk cloth is mounted on board before being used as a painting. The silk cloth is arranged from Murshidabad district of West Bengal, famously known as murshidabad silk, and at first washed silk cloth by hand or in the washing machine on a gentle cycle with warm water. followed by mounting on paper board with adhesive.  As water colors would tend to bleed/run more than the other paints it is required to keep the paints fairly thick without too much water added in. She applies adhesive over the mounted silk cloth to hold the water color otherwise it will spread & leave it for 2 to 3 hours for drying. The amount of adhesive to be applied over the silk cloth is tricky as one have to be very careful as two much adhesive might not be good.

Exhibitions 
Performed Solo & Group Shows at:
 Academy of Fine Arts, Kokata
 AIFACS, New Delhi
 Alliance Francaise, New Delhi
 Birla Academy, Kolkata
 Chitrakala Parishad, Bangalore
 Chemould Art Gallery, Kolkata
 DD Neroy Art Gallery, Mumbai
 Epicenter, Gurgaon
 Information Center, Kolkata
 ICCR, Kolkata
 Jehangir Art Gallery, Mumbai
 Lalit Kala Academy, New Delhi
 Open Palm Court  IHC, New Delhi
 Sridharani Art Gallery, New Delhi
 State Gallery of Fine Arts, Hyderabad
 Visual Art Gallery  IHC, New Delhi

Exhibitions for Social Cause
 " On Women empowerment" in association with Central Social Welfare Board at Sridharani Art Gallery, New Delhi 2012
 " On Color discrimination" in association with Gallery Sree Arts at Alliance Francaise, Aug 2014.

References

External links

Artist Website
Painter Uma Bardhan in quest of 'Soul of my country', DNA India

1945 births
Living people
Indian women painters
20th-century Indian painters
20th-century Indian women artists
21st-century Indian painters
21st-century Indian women artists
Artists from Kolkata
University of Calcutta alumni
Indian women contemporary artists
Indian contemporary painters
Women artists from West Bengal
Painters from West Bengal